Paul Charles Weick (August 25, 1899 – May 22, 1997) was a United States circuit judge of the United States Court of Appeals for the Sixth Circuit and previously was a United States district judge of the United States District Court for the Northern District of Ohio.

Education and career

Born in Youngstown, Ohio, Weick was a member of the Student Army Training Corps in 1918. He received a Bachelor of Laws from the University of Cincinnati College of Law in 1920. He was in private practice in Akron, Ohio from 1920 to 1956, with a brief stint in Youngstown in 1927.

Federal judicial service

Weick was nominated by President Dwight D. Eisenhower on February 27, 1956, to a seat on the United States District Court for the Northern District of Ohio vacated by Judge Emerich B. Freed. He was confirmed by the United States Senate on March 28, 1956, and received his commission the next day. Weick served in that capacity until October 7, 1959, due to his elevation to the Sixth Circuit.

Weick was nominated by President Eisenhower on August 5, 1959, to a seat on the United States Court of Appeals for the Sixth Circuit vacated by Judge Florence E. Allen. He was confirmed by the Senate on September 9, 1959, and received his commission the next day. He served as Chief Judge from 1963 to 1969 and as a member of the Judicial Conference of the United States from 1964 to 1969. He assumed senior status on December 31, 1981. Weick served in that capacity until his death on May 22, 1997, in Stow, Ohio.

References

Sources
 

1899 births
1997 deaths
Judges of the United States District Court for the Northern District of Ohio
United States district court judges appointed by Dwight D. Eisenhower
Judges of the United States Court of Appeals for the Sixth Circuit
United States court of appeals judges appointed by Dwight D. Eisenhower
20th-century American judges
Lawyers from Youngstown, Ohio
People from Akron, Ohio
University of Cincinnati College of Law alumni
People from Youngstown, Ohio